This article lists important figures and events in Malaysian public affairs during the year 2003, together with births and deaths of notable Malaysians.

Incumbent political figures

Federal level
Yang di-Pertuan Agong: Tuanku Syed Sirajuddin
Raja Permaisuri Agong: Tuanku Fauziah
Prime Minister:
Mahathir Mohamad (until 31 October)
Abdullah Ahmad Badawi (from 31 October)
Deputy Prime Minister: Abdullah Ahmad Badawi (until 31 October)
Chief Justice: Mohamed Dzaiddin Abdullah then Ahmad Fairuz Abdul Halim

State level
 Sultan of Johor: Sultan Iskandar
 Sultan of Kedah: Sultan Abdul Halim Muadzam Shah
 Sultan of Kelantan: Sultan Ismail Petra
 Raja of Perlis: Tuanku Syed Faizuddin (Regent)
 Sultan of Perak: Sultan Azlan Shah
 Sultan of Pahang: Sultan Ahmad Shah
 Sultan of Selangor: Sultan Sharafuddin Idris Shah
 Sultan of Terengganu: Sultan Mizan Zainal Abidin (Deputy Yang di-Pertuan Agong)
 Yang di-Pertuan Besar of Negeri Sembilan: Tuanku Jaafar
 Yang di-Pertua Negeri (Governor) of Penang: Tun Abdul Rahman Abbas
 Yang di-Pertua Negeri (Governor) of Malacca: Tun Syed Ahmad Al-Haj bin Syed Mahmud Shahabuddin
 Yang di-Pertua Negeri (Governor) of Sarawak: Tun Abang Mohammad Salahuddin
 Yang di-Pertua Negeri (Governor) of Sabah: Tun Sakaran Dandai (until 31 December)

Events
1 January –Visit Johor Year 2003 officially began.
1 January – The indirect advertising of tobacco brands was banned by the Malaysian federal government.
4 January – Mathematics and Science subjects in English were introduced to all primary and secondary schools for the first time.
14 February – The Southern Integrated Gateway projects (new CIQ complex and new bridge) in Johor Bahru were officially launched by the Malaysian prime minister, Mahathir Mohamad.
23 February – About 20,000 people rallied in the National Stadium, Bukit Jalil to show support for "Malaysians for Peace".
20–25 February – The Non-Aligned Movement (NAM) General Conference was held in Kuala Lumpur.
9 March – Sultan Sharafuddin Idris Shah was crowned as the 9th Sultan of Selangor.
5 April – A 64-year-old man from Jerantut, Pahang died of Severe Acute Respiatory Syndrome (SARS) virus.
May — The Royal Malaysian Air Force (RMAF) signed a deal to purchase 18 Russian Sukhoi Su-30MKM jet fighters worth almost $1 billion. The Su-30MKMs would be delivered in batches starting in early 2007. As part of the deal, the Russians would send a Malaysian astronaut (angkasawan) to the International Space Station (ISS).
23 May – Ling Liong Sik resigns as MCA president.
25 May – A 19-year-old salesgirl died when a car driven by 21-year-old college student crashed into her and several friends seated at a table set up at a roadside in front of a 24-hour restaurant in Section 14, Petaling Jaya, Selangor.
14 June – IT analyst, Canny Ong was raped and murdered. Her body was found at the New Pantai Expressway construction site in Jalan Klang Lama near Kampung Dato' Harun, Petaling Jaya, Selangor.
23 June – The base of a tower once part of the Porto de Santiago fort built by the Portuguese 500 years earlier was discovered near Padang Pahlawan, Malacca.
24 July – Malaysia and Singapore jointly submitted to the International Court of Justice (ICJ) a dispute concerning sovereignty over Pulau Batu Puteh (Pedra Branca), Middle Rocks and South Ledge.
24 July – The Federal Special Forces of Malaysia (FSFM) was declared an illegal organisation by the federal government because its activities posed a threat to national security. Nor Azami Ahmad Ghazali the leader of the FSFM and 24 of its members were arrested.
3 August – Abdul Malik Mydin became the first Malaysian and Southeast Asian to cross the English Channel by swimming from Dover, England to Calais, France.
August – Naza Ria, Malaysia's first MPV vehicle was launched.
26 August – Sultanah Bahiyah of Kedah, a consort of Sultan Abdul Halim Muadzam Shah of Kedah died of cancer. She was buried at the Kedah Royal Mausoleum in Langgar.
31 August – The quick-march version of Negaraku national anthem reverted to the original slow-march version.
31 August – Malaysia's first monorail transit system, KL Monorail began operations.
September – The Royal Malaysian Navy (RMN) signed a deal to purchase two of the French s worth almost $1 billion.
18 September – Prime Minister Mahathir Mohamad paid a glowing tribute to former MCA president Ling Liong Sik for his successful service as transport minister and Cabinet minister for 27 years.
23 September – Media Prima Berhad, Malaysia's largest integrated media group of companies was launched.
3 October – Berjaya Times Square, the highest shopping complex in Malaysia was officially opened.
15 October – The opening of Malacca Tropical Fruit Farm in Malacca.
16–17 October – The Organisation of Islamic Conference (OIC) General Conference was held in Putrajaya.
22 October – Alor Star was granted city status.
31 October – Abdullah Ahmad Badawi became the fifth prime minister, replacing Mahathir Mohamad.
25 November – The construction of the SMART Tunnel projects began.
26 November – A rockfall on the New Klang Valley Expressway (NKVE) near the Bukit Lanjan interchange caused the expressway to close for more than six months.
1 December – 14 passengers were killed in an early morning collision involving two buses – a school bus which was converted for commercial use and an express bus – at the 63rd kilometre of the Kuala Lipis-Merapoh trunk road near Merapoh, Pahang. 23 others were injured.
December – The Malaysian National Service (Program Latihan Khidmat Negara (PLKN)) was introduced as the conscription training program.

Births
 6 January – Haqimi Azim – Footballer
 28 January – Izz Ilham – Actor
 24 April — Syamim Razi — Actor
 16 May — Narveen Raveentranath Tagoor — Rapper 
 16 September – Muhammad Danial Mohd Saifulazhar – Actor 
 26 November — William Hollings — Footballer

Deaths
5 July – Tun Sulaiman Ninam Shah – UMNO annual meeting permanent chairman.
9 August – Ali Bakar – Footballer
26 August – Sultanah Bahiyah of Kedah
19 October – Dato' Seri Harun Idris – Former Selangor Menteri Besar.

See also
 2003
 List of Malaysian films of 2003
 2002 in Malaysia | 2004 in Malaysia
 History of Malaysia

References

 
2000s in Malaysia
Years of the 21st century in Malaysia
Malaysia
Malaysia